Romano Caneva (December 11, 1904 in Milan – August 8, 1980) was an Italian boxer who competed in the 1928 Summer Olympics.

In 1928 he was eliminated in the quarter-finals of the welterweight class after losing his fight to the upcoming gold medalist Ted Morgan.

1928 Olympic results
Below is the record of Romano Caneva, an Italian welterweight boxer who competed at the 1928 Amsterdam Olympics:

 Round of 32: bye
 Round of 16: defeated Harry Dunn (Great Britain) on points
 Quarterfinal: lost to Ted Morgan (New Zealand) on points

References

External links
profile

1904 births
1980 deaths
Boxers from Milan
Welterweight boxers
Olympic boxers of Italy
Boxers at the 1928 Summer Olympics
Italian male boxers
20th-century Italian people